Bengt Christer Wallin (born 17 June 1969 in Timrå, Västernorrland) is a former freestyle swimmer from Sweden. He won the  silver medal in the 4 × 200 m freestyle relay at the 1992 Summer Olympics together Tommy Werner, Anders Holmertz and Lars Frölander.

Four years later, when Atlanta, Georgia hosted the Summer Olympics, Wallin was on the team that once again captured the silver medal, this time alongside Frölander, Holmertz, and Anders Lyrbring. Wallin competed in three consecutive Summer Olympics for his native country, starting in 1988.

Clubs 
 Umeå SS
 Mölndals ASS

References 
 databaseOlympics
 

1969 births
Living people
People from Timrå Municipality
Swimmers at the 1988 Summer Olympics
Swimmers at the 1992 Summer Olympics
Swimmers at the 1996 Summer Olympics
Olympic swimmers of Sweden
Olympic silver medalists for Sweden
Swedish male freestyle swimmers
World Aquatics Championships medalists in swimming
Medalists at the FINA World Swimming Championships (25 m)
European Aquatics Championships medalists in swimming
Umeå SS swimmers
Mölndals ASS swimmers
Medalists at the 1996 Summer Olympics
Medalists at the 1992 Summer Olympics
Olympic silver medalists in swimming
Sportspeople from Västernorrland County